Martin Lücker (born 11 October 1953) is a German classical organist, and professor at the Hochschule für Musik und Darstellende Kunst Frankfurt am Main.

Career 
Born in Preußisch Oldendorf, Lücker studied organ in Hannover and in Vienna with Anton Heiller, and conducting in Detmold with Martin Stephani. He first worked there at the Landestheater Detmold as repetiteur, then as assistant of the choir director at the Oper Frankfurt.

From 1983, he has been organist of the main Protestant church of Frankfurt, the Katharinenkirche. He has been professor of Künstlerisches Orgelspiel und Methodik/Didaktik des Orgelunterrichtes (concert organ playing and didactic of teaching organ playing) at the Hochschule für Musik und Darstellende Kunst Frankfurt am Main from 1998. From August 2011 to 2016, he was also the conductor of the Figuralchor Frankfurt.

At the Katharinenkirche, he established two regular concert series. In "30 Minuten Orgelmusik" (30 minutes of organ music“, he plays every Monday and Thursday at 4:30 pm a free concert of 30 minutes, playing the 3000th concert in 2013. In "Musik in Sankt Katharinen" (Music in Saint Catharine's), he offers two organ concerts a months, played by himself and guests, and choral music with the Kantorei St. Katharinen.

In 2012, he played a concert at the historic Stumm organ of the Rheingauer Dom with a program that Albert Schweitzer had performed in Frankfurt in 1928 on a similar instrument that was destroyed. He celebrated his 30th anniversary at the Katharinenkirche with a concert.

Selected recordings 

 Johann Sebastian Bach, Leipziger Spätwerke. Hänssler CD 92.100
 Johann Sebastian Bach, Eine Weimarer Tonleiter. Hänssler CD 92.091 
 Das Frankfurter Orgelbuch, Sieben zeitgenössische Orgelstücke, Melisma MELI 7114-2
 Works by Bach, Vivaldi, Stanley and others with Reinhold Friedrich (trumpet) and Hartmut Friedrich (trombone). Capriccio 10483

References

External links 

Christia Rupp: Für eine halbe Million Ohren - 3000. Konzert „30 Minuten Orgelmusik“ nmz, 30 June 2013 
Mark Obert: Folge 84: Martin Lücker Der rote Faden: Sein Glück – unser Glück Frankfurter Neue Presse, 9 August 2014 

German classical organists
German male organists
1953 births
Living people
21st-century organists
21st-century German male musicians
Male classical organists